The Free Sunnis of Baalbek Brigade, also known as the Ahrar al-Sunna Baalbek Brigade, was a Sunni jihadist group active in Lebanon. It first rose to prominence in November 2013 when it retaliated against the Shia Islamist group Hezbollah, after clashes between locals Sunnis in Baalbek and members of Hezbollah. The group is known for attacking the Iranian embassy in Beirut in 2013 and attacking Christian churches. On 30 June 2014, the group pledged its allegiance to the Islamic State of Iraq and the Levant (ISIL).

References 

2014 establishments in Asia
2014 establishments in Lebanon
Anti-Shi'ism
Factions of the Islamic State of Iraq and the Levant
Islamic terrorism in Lebanon
Jihadist groups
Salafi Jihadist groups
Qutbist organisations